Donnerhall (May 31, 1981 – January 14, 2002) was a dressage stallion who was known not only for having a successful career as a sport horse, but also passing on his abilities to his offspring to become an influential sire.

Pedigree
Donnerhall was by Donnerwetter, a stallion who stood at Grönwohldhof and competed at Grand Prix level with Herbert and Karin Rehbin before he was sold to the United States in 1990. His other approved sons include Donnerkiel, Dobrock and Don Wienero L.

Donnerhall's dam, Ninette, also produced the mare Noblesse (by Pik Bube I). Ninette was from the Nagate line of mares. Her sire, Markus, was half-Thoroughbred and his sire Manolete xx is also found in the great eventing horse Volturno, winner of 2 Olympic silver medals and a silver medal at the 1978 World Championships in Lexington.

He was approved for Hanoverian, Westphalian, Holstein, Bavarian, Baden-Wurttemberg, Hessen, KWPN, Danish Warmblood studbooks.

Dressage career
Donnerhall began his career in 1984, placing second out of 70 horses at his Stallion Performance Test held in Adelheidsdorf, with a score of 131.92. According to his rider, he was very easy to train, reaching the Grand Prix level of training in 2 years . He was especially known for his expressive passage, piaffe, and extended trot.

Donnerhall had a stellar career as a dressage horse, winning some of the most prestigious competitions, including over 65 FEI Grand Prix Dressage classes and a life earning of D.M. 640,000. He was 1986 German DLG Champion in Hanover, beating out the very athletic Hanoverian stallion World Cup I. In 1994 German Champion (Mannheim), won the team gold and individual bronze at the Dressage World Championship in 1994 and at the European Dressage Championship in 1997 in Verden. In 1997, he also won the World Cup European League. Donnerhall earned his third team gold while finishing 4th individually at the 1998 Dressage World Championship. He was also named Oldenburg Stallion of the Year in 1998.

The stallion then went on a "farewell tour" that same year, retiring from competitive sport at the age of 17. He died January 2002 of acute intestinal toxicopathy.

Breeding career
Donnerhall has the highest dressage breeding value of all stallions at 271, and has produced over 77 approved sons, 450 broodmares (84 State Premium), and over 636 competition horses .

Like his sire, Donnerhall stood at Grönwohldhof. His first few years produced only a few offspring, as the stud was a good distance from the main Oldenburg breeding areas. Within a few years, however, his popularity grew immensely. At the 1998 Federal Championship in Warendorf, more than 50% of the horses had Donnerhall in their pedigree .

Donnerhall passes on his flowing gait, presence, trainability, and excellent temperament.

The 2007 Hanoverian Stallion had Donnerhall offspring 763 winning dressage competitors (84 as show jumpers), with prize money totaling Euro 1,502,302.

Offspring include:
 Don Primero: Champion 5-year old German dressage horse in Verden at the 1990 Bundeschampionate (score of 9.3), now a Grand Prix level dressage horse, siring offspring which sell at 6-figures.
 Don Schufro: exported to Denmark, successful at Grand Prix with Andreas Helgstrand
  Don Frederico: Champion of 1999 Hanovarian stallion licensing and considered second most valuable sport horse stallion with a Breeding Value Index of 174 points.
 Donnerschlag
 Donner bube: located in Wetaskiwin, Alberta, Canada -owner Dr. David Bell and Roxy Bell
 Donnerschwee: sold for DM 220.000, the highest price up to that time paid for a horse at a German Breeding Association auction. Now competes at Grand Prix.
 Dubai: Stallion belonging to the Royal Canadian Mounted Police.
 Primavera: Champion Mare of the Oldenburg elite mare show in 1992, Champion Riding Horse in 1992, and third in the federal championships
 Deutsche Einheit: second in the Federal Championships in Verden in 1992. Sold for what was at that time a record price at the German Breed Societies auctions reaching DM420,000 (£147,000).
 Rastede Schloßpark: 4th place at the German Dressage Horse Championships
 De Niro
 Davignon I: Federal Riding Horse Champion of 1992.
 Hallo: won the elite mare show in Rastede in 1994.
 Duntroon: vice-champion stallion of the Oldenburg approvals in 1993; won the stallion performance test in Adelheidsdorf in 1994.
 High Noon 15: top dressage mare, full sister to Hallo.
 Donatello: Germany’s highest priced auction horse at the time he was sold (1996).
 Deinhard: sold to The Netherlands for DM 155,000 (£54,500) at the Vechta foal auction in 1998, a record price for a foal.

Sources

External links
 Video of Donnerhall in a test
 Video of Donnerhall with son, Donnerschlag

Dressage horses
Sport horse sires
Individual warmbloods
1981 animal births
2002 animal deaths